Eubranchus olivaceus is a species of sea slug or nudibranch, a marine gastropod mollusc in the family Eubranchidae.

Distribution
This species was described from Jesse Island and Brandon Island, Departure Bay, and the biological research station at Nanaimo, Vancouver Island, Canada. It is considered by some authors to be a synonym of the North Atlantic species Eubranchus rupium.

Biology
In the original description Eubranchus olivaceus is reported to feed on Obelia longissima. It is also reported to feed on the hydroids Laomedea flexuosa, Obelia spp., & Plumularia sp.

References

Eubranchidae
Gastropods described in 1922